Amolops cremnobatus is a species of frogs in the family Ranidae. It is found in north-central Laos and Vietnam. Its range might extend into Thailand. The specific name cremnobatus  is derived from Greek kremnobates, meaning "frequenter of steep places", and refers to the steep waterfall from which the type series were collected. Common name Lao sucker frog has been coined for it.

Description
The overall appearance is slender, with the head wider than the body. The snout is short and almost truncate. The tympanum is distinct. The fingers are short but bear very wide discs; the medial edges of second and third fingers have distinct skin folds. The toes bear somewhat smaller discs and are fully webbed. Preserved specimens are dorsally and laterally black and have irregular, small, light markings that are yellowish brown in life. The dorsolateral folds are marked by series of short, light bars. The limbs bear wide, black crossbars. The ventral surfaces are white, sometimes with weak, black suffusion.

The tadpoles are dorsally and laterally black and ventrally white.

Habitat and conservation
The eggs are adhesive and deposited in clutches on wet vertical rock faces within the splash zone of cascades. The tadpoles live clinged to and climbing on the same rock faces.

Although Amolops cremnobatus can live in slightly disturbed forest, it is likely to suffer from changes in hydrological conditions (e.g., damming), habitat loss caused by logging, conversion to agriculture, and the development of infrastructure. It is also collected for food. It is known from a number of protected areas: Pù Mát National Park as well as Pu Hoat and Pu Hu Nature Reserves in Vietnam, and Nakai–Nam Theun National Biodiversity Conservation Area in Laos.

References

cremnobatus
Amphibians of Laos
Amphibians of Vietnam
Taxa named by Robert F. Inger
Taxa named by Maurice Kottelat
Amphibians described in 1998
Taxonomy articles created by Polbot